Kumam is not a Luo (also spelled LWO) dialect of Uganda although past linguists have wrongly grouped it under Luo languages. It is rather an Ateker language mixed with Luo vocabularies spoken by the Kumam people of Uganda.
It is estimated that Kumam dialect has 82 percent lexical similarity with Acholi dialect, 81 percent with Langi dialect and 20 percent with Teso language. However, these are often counted as separate languages despite common ethnic origins due to linguistic shift occasioned by geographical movement.
Kumam is widely spoken in the Ugandan districts of  [[Kaberamaido][kalaki] [soroti] and Dokolo.

The alphabet

There are twenty two letters in the Kumam alphabet F,H,Q,V,H,X and Z are not used and η and NY are added. F,H,Q,V,H,X,Z only appear in loan words. The pronunciation guides that follow are for practice only; the correct sounds can only be learned by practice from a teacher or an audio media.

There are five vowels in Kumam: A, E, I, O, and U. These five letters, however, represent more than five sounds, for the letters E, I, O and U have two values each; a "close" value and an "open" value.

Basic lexicon

Hello – yoga 
How are you? –Itiye benyo (singular), Itiyenu benyo (plural) 
Fine, and you? – Atiye ber, arai bon yin? 
Fine – Atiye ber or just ber 
What is your name? – Nying in en Ngai? 
My name is ... – Nying ango en ... 
Name --- Nying 
Nice to see you. --- Apwoyo Neno in (also: Apwoyo Neno wun) 
See you again --- Oneno bobo 
Book – Itabo 
Because – Pi Ento

The first sentence in the bible can be translated as I ya gege, Rubanga ocweo wi polo kede piny ("In the beginning God made the heaven and the earth" ).

References

Luo languages